The Iowa Short Fiction Award is an annual award given for a first collection of short fiction. It has been described as "a respected prize" by the Chicago Tribune, and The New York Times considered it "among the most prestigious literary prizes America offers."

The award was founded by the University of Iowa Press in 1969, and has been continuously presented to a writer of short stories each year since. In 1988, a companion award called the John Simmons Short Fiction Award, named for the original director of the University of Iowa Press, was instituted. Both the Iowa Short Fiction Award and the John Simmons Short Fiction Award are juried through the Iowa Writers' Workshop, and winning books are published by the University of Iowa Press. 

Select stories from winning entries are included in The Iowa Award: The Best Stories from Twenty Years and The Iowa Award: The Best Stories, 1991-2000, with selections by American author Frank Conroy.

Winners of the Iowa Short Fiction Award by year
 2022: Stories No One Hopes Are About Them by A. J. Bermudez
 2021: The Boundaries of Their Dwelling by Blake Sanz
 2020: Father Guards the Sheep by Sari Rosenblatt
 2019: Not a Thing to Comfort You by Emily Wortman-Wunder
 2018: The Water Diviner and Other Stories by Ruvanee Pietersz Vilhauer
 2017: Outside Is the Ocean by Matthew Lansburgh
 2016: November Storm by Robert Oldshue
 2015: Night in Erg Chebbi and Other Stories by Edward Hamlin
 2014: The Lovers Set Down Their Spoons by Heather A. Slomski
 2013: Lungs Full of Noise by Tessa Mellas
 2012: Safe As Houses by Marie-Helene Bertino
 2011: Power Ballads by Will Boast
 2010: The Company of Heaven: Stories from Haiti by Marilène Phipps-Kettlewell
 2009: All That Work and Still No Boys by Kathryn Ma
 2008: Invite by Glen Pourciau
 2007: Desert Gothic by Don Waters
 2006: Things Kept, Things Left Behind by Jim Tomlinson
 2005: The Thin Tear in the Fabric of Space by Doug Trevor
 2004: What You've Been Missing by Janet Desaulniers
 2003: Bring Me Your Saddest Arizona by Ryan Harty
 2002: Her Kind of Want by Jennifer S. Davis
 2001: Ticket to Minto: Stories of India and America by Sohrab Homi Fracis
 2000: Troublemakers by John McNally
 1999: House Fires by Nancy Reisman
 1998: The River of Lost Voices: Stories from Guatemala by Mark Brazaitis
 1997: Thank You for Being Concerned and Sensitive by Jim Henry
 1996: Hints of His Mortality by David Borofka
 1995: May You Live in Interesting Times by Tereze Glück
 1994: Igloo Among Palms by Rod Val Moore
 1993: Where Love Leaves Us by Renée Manfredi and Macauley's Thumb by Lex Williford
 1992: My Body to You by Elizabeth Searle
 1991: Traps by Sondra Spatt Olsen
 1990: A Hole in the Language by Marly Swick
 1989: Lent: The Slow Fast by Starkey Flythe, Jr.
 1988: The Long White by Sharon Dilworth
 1987: Fruit of the Month by Abby Frucht and Star Game by Lucia Nevai
 1986: Eminent Domain by Dan O'Brien and Resurrectionists by Russell Working
 1985: Dancing in the Movies by Robert Boswell
 1984: Old Wives' Tales by Susan M. Dodd
 1983: Heart Failure by Ivy Goodman
 1982: Shiny Objects by Dianne Benedict
 1981: The Phototropic Woman by Annabel Thomas
 1980: Impossible Appetites by James Fetler
 1979: Fly Away Home by Mary Hedin
 1978: A Nest of Hooks by Lon Otto
 1977: The Women in the Mirror by Pat Carr
 1976: The Black Velvet Girl by C.E. Poverman
 1975: Harry Belten and the Mendelssohn Violin Concerto by Barry Targan
 1974: After the First Death There Is No Other by Natalie L. M. Petesch
 1973: The Itinerary of Beggars by H. E. Francis
 1972: The Burning and Other Stories by Jack Cady
 1971: Old Morals, Small Continents, Darker Times by Philip F. O'Connor
 1970: The Beach Umbrella by Cyrus Colter

Winners of the John Simmons Short Fiction Award by year
 2022: The Woods by Janice Obuchowski
 2021: You Never Get It Back by Cara Blue Adams
 2020: Ancestry by Eileen O'Leary
 2019: Happy Like This by Ashley Wurzbacher
 2018: The Lightning Jar by Christian Felt
 2017: What Counts as Love by Marian Crotty
 2016: Of This New World by Allegra Hyde
 2015: Excommunicados by Charles Haverty
 2014: Mystical Creatures Attack! by Kathleen Founds
 2013: If I'd Known You Were Coming by Kate Milliken
 2012: Tell Everyone I Said Hi by Chad Simpson
 2011: Pulp and Paper by Josh Rolnick
 2010: Lester Higata's 20th Century by Barbara Hamby
 2009: How to Leave Hialeah: Stories from the Heart of Miami by Jennine Capó Crucet
 2008: One Dog Happy by Molly McNett
 2007: Whose World Is This? by Lee Montgomery
 2006: Permanent Visitors by Kevin Moffett
 2005: This Day in History by Anthony Varallo
 2004: Here Beneath Low-Flying Planes by Merrill Feitell
 2003: American Wives by Beth Helms
 2002: The Kind of Things Saints Do by Laura Valeri
 2001: Fire Road by Donald Anderson
 2000: Articles of Faith by Elizabeth Oness
 1999: Out of the Girls' Room and into the Night by Thisbe Nissen
 1998: Friendly Fire by Kathryn Chetkovich
 1997: Within the Lighted City by Lisa Lenzo
 1996: Western Electric by Don Zancanella
 1995: Listening to Mozart by Charles Wyatt 
 1994: The Good Doctor by Susan Onthank Mates
 1993: Happiness by Ann Harleman
 1992: Imaginary Men by Enid Shomer
 1991: The Ant Generator by Elizabeth Harris
 1989: Line of Fall by Miles Wilson
 1988: The Venus Tree by Michael Pritchett

Guest judges by year

 2022: Anthony Marra
 2021: Brandon Taylor 
 2020: Tom Drury
 2019: Carmen Maria Machado
 2018: Rebecca Lee
 2017: Andre Dubus III
 2016: Bennett Sims
 2015: Karen Russell
 2014: Wells Tower
 2013: Julie Orringer
 2012: Jim Shepard
 2011: Yiyun Li
 2000: Elizabeth McCracken
 1999: Marilynne Robinson
 1998: Stuart Dybek
 1997: Ann Beattie
 1996: Oscar Hijeulos
 1995: Ethan Canin
 1994: Joy Williams
 1993: Francine Prose
 1992: James Salter
 1991: Marilynne Robinson
 1990: Jayne Anne Phillips
 1989: Gail Godwin
 1988: Robert Stone
 1987: Alison Lurie
 1986: Tobias Wolff
 1985: Tim O'Brien
 1984: Frederick Busch
 1983: Alice Adams
 1982: Raymond Carver
 1981: Doris Grumbach
 1980: Francine du Plessix Gray
 1979: John Gardner
 1978: Stanley Elkin
 1977: Leonard Michaels
 1976: Donald Bathelme
 1975: George P. Garrett
 1974: William H. Gass
 1973: John Hawkes
 1972: Joyce Carol Oates
 1971: George P. Elliott
 1970: Vance Bourjaily and Kurt Vonnegut

References

External links
University of Iowa Press
Iowa Short Fiction Award
Iowa Short Fiction Award Winners

Short story awards
Iowa Writers' Workshop
Awards established in 1969
1969 establishments in Iowa
American fiction awards